Vəlibəyli (also, Belibeyli and Velibeyli) is a village in the Lachin Rayon of Azerbaijan.

References 

Populated places in Lachin District